Janeen A. Sollman is an American politician serving as a member of the Oregon State Senate from the 15th district. She previously served as a member of the Oregon House of Representatives from 2017 to 2022.

Career
Sollman served on board of the Hillsboro School District from 2009 until 2017. In the 2013 election, she defeated Rich Vial, also a future state representative. She served as board chair from 2011 until 2013. Sollman filed to run for the House after incumbent Democrat Joe Gallegos announced his retirement. In the general election, she defeated Republican Dan Mason and Libertarian Kyle Markley, receiving 52% of the vote.

In January 2022, Sollman was appointed to the Oregon State Senate by members of the  Washington County Board of Commissioners. She was succeeded in the House by Nathan Sosa.

Personal life
Sollman and her husband, Tony, have two children.

References

External links
 Campaign website
 Legislative website

Date of birth missing (living people)
Living people
Democratic Party members of the Oregon House of Representatives
School board members in Oregon
Politicians from Hillsboro, Oregon
Women state legislators in Oregon
21st-century American politicians
21st-century American women politicians
Year of birth missing (living people)